Money Minters is a Canadian short documentary film, directed by Ted De Wit and released in 1958. Sponsored by INCO and the Royal Canadian Mint, the film documents the process of making a coin from the initial mining of metal ore at Sudbury to the coin's final production at the Royal Canadian Mint.

The film was one of three co-winners, alongside The Quest and The Tall Country, of the Canadian Film Award for Best Theatrical Short Film at the 11th Canadian Film Awards in 1959.

References

External links
Money Minters at the National Film Board of Canada

1958 films
Canadian short documentary films
Best Theatrical Short Film Genie and Canadian Screen Award winners
National Film Board of Canada short films
1958 short films
Films shot in Greater Sudbury
1950s English-language films
1950s Canadian films